Daniel Hallberg, (born 30 September 1987) is a Swedish comedian and television presenter. 

In 2019, Hallberg presented Grammisgalan 2019 along with Rennie Mirro. Hallberg has participated in the stageshow and later on the talk show television version of  Luuk & Hallberg along with Kristian Luuk which has been broadcast on SVT. 

Hallberg presented Musikhjälpen 2019, which were broadcast on Sveriges Radio and SVT.

References

1987 births
Living people
Swedish comedians